Phytoecia rubropunctata is a species of beetle in the family Cerambycidae. It was described by Johann August Ephraim Goeze in 1777, originally under the genus Leptura. It is known from Germany, France, Spain, and Italy. It feeds on Trinia glauca.

References

Phytoecia
Taxa named by Johann August Ephraim Goeze
Beetles described in 1777